To The West, with words by Charles Mackay and music by Henry Russell, was one of the most popular songs of the mid-nineteenth century in England.

Of the song Russell boasted at the time that it created such a furore at the time of the mass emigrations of the 1840s that it "induced many thousands of people to turn attention to the promises held out by the New World."

References

British songs
19th-century songs
Songs with music by Henry Russell (musician)